The Grasscutter is a 1988 film directed by Ian Mune and written by Roy Mitchell. It was shot in the south of New Zealand, in Dunedin and Queenstown.

The music was written by Don McGlashan and Wayne Laird.

A landscape architect (Cooper) living in New Zealand finds that his past catches up with him. Ulster Volunteer Force (UVF) loyalists from Northern Ireland have discovered the new identity he was given after becoming a "supergrass" and come after him, drastically increasing New Zealand's violent crime rate in the process.

References
 Martin, Helen and Edwards, Sam, New Zealand Film 1912-1996, Oxford, 1997.

External links
 

1988 films
New Zealand drama films
1988 drama films
Films about The Troubles (Northern Ireland)
Dunedin in fiction
1980s English-language films
Films directed by Ian Mune